Georgia Barnett (born ) is a New Zealand field hockey player. A goalkeeper, she represents the Central Mysticks in the New Zealand National Hockey League.

She currently plays for the New Zealand women's national field hockey team. With the national youth team she won the bronze medal at the 2010 Summer Youth Olympics. Barnett's coaching career began in 2019 when she coached the Central U18 women's team to gold at the national tournament.

Life
Barnett was educated at Palmerston North Intermediate Normal School then Palmerston North Girls' High School. 
She completed her Massey University business studies degree in Palmerston North.

Awards
In 2015, she became Manawatu Sportswoman of the Year.

References

External links
http://www.fieldhockey.com/archives/index.php/2016/40-june/891-news-for-05-june-2016
http://www.stuff.co.nz/sport/64490307/blacks-sticks-side-the-goal-for-georgia-barnett

1994 births
Living people
New Zealand female field hockey players
Field hockey players at the 2010 Summer Youth Olympics
People educated at Palmerston North Girls' High School
20th-century New Zealand women
21st-century New Zealand women